Jonathan M. Singer was a podiatrist and award-winning photographer from New Jersey in the United States. His original edition of the book Botanica Magnifica, consisting of five volumes, was recently donated to the Smithsonian Institution.

Singer has won the Hasselblad Laureate Award and the 2009 Carl Linnaeus Silver Medal. Dr. Singer died June 22, 2019.

References

External links
 Jonathan M. Singer page on the Abbeville Press website

Living people
American photographers
People from New Jersey
Year of birth missing (living people)